Foreign relations exist between Australia and Malta. Both countries have full embassy level diplomatic relations since 1967.  As both countries are members of the Commonwealth, both are represented by High Commissions, with Australia maintaining a High Commission in Valletta, and   Malta a High Commission in Canberra. In addition, Malta has two Consulates-General (in Melbourne and Sydney), and four  honorary consulates (in Adelaide, Ascot Vale, Melbourne and Perth).

High level meetings

In 1956, Prime Minister Robert Menzies visited Malta en route to the Commonwealth Prime Ministers' Conference in London. During a short visit, he held talks with Maltese Prime Minister Dom Mintoff.

In February 2009, the President of Malta, Eddie Fenech Adami embarked on a state visit to Australia  where he met Governor-General Quentin Bryce and Prime Minister Kevin Rudd.  During an official dinner in honour of the Maltese President, Kevin Rudd declared "Australia would not be as complete without Malta".  In the same month, Maltese Deputy Prime Minister and Foreign Affairs Minister Tonio Borg visited Australia for discussions with Australian foreign minister Stephen Smith, where the commercial relationship between the two countries were discussed, in particular the signing of a contract between a Perth-based shipbuilding company and the Maltese armed forces for the construction and delivery of four inshore Austal-class patrol craft.

See also 

 Foreign relations of Australia
 Foreign relations of Malta
 Maltese Australians

External links 
  Australia Department of Foreign Affairs and Trade about relations with Malta
  Australian High Commission in Valletta
  Maltese representations in Australia

References

 
Malta 
Bilateral relations of Malta